This is part of a list of Statutes of New Zealand for the period of the Second National Government of New Zealand up to and including part of the first year of the Third Labour Government of New Zealand.

1960s

1961  

 Beachlands Domain Board Empowering Act 
 Borough of Port Chalmers Leasing Empowering Act 
 Broadcasting Corporation Act  Amended: 1965/67/68/70/71
 Carter Trust Act 
 Cook County Council Empowering Act 
 Crimes Act  Amended: 1910/15/20/22/41/50/52/54/55/63/66/69/73/77/78/79/80/82/85/86/87/88/89/91/93/94/95/97/98/2000/01/02/03/05/06
 Dairy Production and Marketing Board Act  Amended: 1962/63/65
 Engineering Associates Act  Amended: 1964/68/76/88/96/2007
 International Finance Agreements Act  Amended: 1966/68/75/76/92/98/2007
 Lincoln College Act  Amended: 1966/70/77/87
 Maori Education Foundation Act  Amended: 1962/63/65/70/72/75/77/92
 Massey College Act 
 Monetary and Economic Council Act 
 Motor Spirits Duty Act 
 National Military Service Act  Amended: 1964/68/69
 Nelson Harbour Board and Nelson City Empowering Act 
 Republic of Cyprus Act 
 Tariff and Development Board Act  Amended: 1964/65/67/69/70/71
 Thomas Adoption Discharge Act 
 Universities Act  Amended: 1962/66/70/71/77/78/80/88
 University of Auckland Act  Amended: 1957/66/70/77/87
 University of Canterbury Act  Amended: 1957/66/68/70/77/87
 Victoria University of Wellington Act  Amended: 1957/66/69/70/77/78/87
 Western Samoa Act  Amended: 1970
 Whakatane Board Mills Limited Water Supply Act 
Plus 103 Acts amended

1962  

 Akaroa County Council Empowering Act 
 Central Canterbury Electric Power Board Empowering Act 
 Church of England Children's Trust Act 
 Civil Defence Act  Amended: 1965/67/68/71/75/79/88/89
 Commonwealth Fabric Corporation Act 
 Coromandel County Council Ambulance Levy Act 
 East Coast Permanent Trustees Limited Act  Amended: 1972
 Electricity Advisory Council Act 
 Farm Forestry Act  Amended: 1964
 Gore Borough Empowering Act 
 Historic Articles Act 
 Innkeepers Act  Amended: 1980
 Maori Welfare Act  Amended: 1963
 Massey University College of Manawatu Act 
 Masterton Borough Council Staff Retiring Fund Act 
 Mining Tenures Registration Act  Amended: 1983
 Napier Harbour Board Loan and Empowering Act 
 Nature Conservation Council Act  Amended: 1971
 Occupiers' Liability Act 
 Public Bodies Meetings Act  Amended: 1963/74/75
 Religious Instruction and Observances in Public Schools Act 
 Sale of Liquor Act  Amended: 1963/64/65/67/68/69/70/71/72/74/75/76/77/79/80/81/82/83/85/86/88/89/91/93/94/96/97/99/2001/02/04/05
 Shearers Act  Amended: 1983
 State Services Act  Amended: 1964/65/66/73/74/78/81/82/85/87
 Taumaranui District Services' Memorial Fund Act 
 Te Aroha Borough Water-Supply Empowering Act 
 Timaru Harbour Board and Timaru Council Empowering Act 
 Whangarei Borough Council Empowering Act 
Plus 110 Acts amended

1963  

 Architects Act  Amended: 1979/82/88/97
 Auckland Regional Authority Act  Amended: 1964/65/66/68/69/70/71/72/73/75/78/87
 Auckland Regional Planning Authority Act 
 Criminal Injuries Compensation Act  Amended: 1966/67/69/71
 Dental Act  Amended: 1966/68/71/89/94/99
 Fishing Industry Board Act  Amended: 1965/75/78/81/85/87/94 Repealed: 2001
 Hutt Valley Underground Water Authority Empowering Act 
 Indecent Publications Act 1963
 Liddle Adoption Discharge Act 
 Malaysia Act 
 Manukau County Urban Farm Land Rating Act 
 Massey University of Manawatu Act 
 Matrimonial Proceedings Act  Amended: 1966/68/70
 Matrimonial Property Act  Amended: 1966/67/68/80/83/85/86/87/94/98
 National Research Advisory Council Act  Amended: 1976/86
 North Short Drainage Act 
 Queen Elizabeth the Second Arts Council of New Zealand Act  Amended: 1968/77/78/83/90
 Queen Elizabeth the Second Postgraduate Fellowship of New Zealand Act 
 Real Estate Agents Act  Amended: 1967/68/77/78/81/82/83/87/89/92/94/2005
 Republic of Nigeria Act 
 Republic of Tanganyika Act 
 Rotorua Maori Arts and Crafts Institute Act 
 Secondhand Dealers Act  Amended: 1952/64/67/68/75
 State Insurance Act  Amended: 1983/86
 Telford Farm Training Institute Act 
 Tourist and Publicity Department Act  Amended: 1967/89
 University of Waikato Act  Amended: 1966/70/77/78/87
 Waipawa County Council Empowering Act 
 Whangarei Harbour Board Vesting Empowering Act 
Plus 121 Acts amended

1964  

 Burial and Cremation Act  Amended: 1968/75/76/79/83/97/2000/03
 Christchurch City Reclamation and Empowering Act 
 Continental Shelf Act  Amended: 1996/2005
 Cook Islands Constitution Act  Amended: 1965
 Decimal Currency Act  Amended: 1965/67/73
 Development Finance Corporation Act  Amended: 1970/71/76/77
 Export Guarantee Act  Amended: 1979/89/90
 Featherston County Council Empowering Act 
 Human Tissue Act  Amended: 1968/89
 Oamaru Harbour Board Loan and Empowering Act 
 Perpetuities Act  Amended: 1966/74
 Plumbers and Gasfitters Registration Act  Amended: 1967
 Private Savings Banks Act  Amended: 1970/72/77/78
 Rock Oyster Farming Act  Amended: 1965
 Turangi Township Act  Amended: 1973
 Uganda Act 
 Wool Testing Authority Act  Amended: 1973/80/87
Plus 100 Acts amended

1965  

 Auckland Harbour Board Central Area Properties Redevelopment Act  Amended: 1968
 East Coast Bays Borough Empowering Act 
 Extradition Act  Amended: 1924/67/69/98/2002
 Hamilton Domain Endowment Act  Amended: 1981
 Marlborough County Council Empowering Act  Amended: 1980/83
 Narcotics Act  Amended: 1970
 National Library Act  Amended: 1971/73/76/77/85/87/89/91
 New Zealand - Australia Free Trade Agreement Act 
 News Media Ownership Act 
 Northland Harbour Board Act 
 Oil in Navigable Waters Act 
 Radiation Protection Act  Amended: 1973/74/77/81/86/97
 Republic of Kenya Act 
 Republic of Zambia Act 
 Rotorua County Urban Farm Land Rating Act 
 Taranaki Harbours Act  Amended: 1968/70
 Taranaki Harbours Board Empowering Act 
 Tauranga City Council and Tauranga Electric Power Board Empowering Act 
 Territorial Sea and Fishing Zone Act 
 Waikato Show Trust Act 
 Waikohu County Council Empowering Act 
 Wanganui Masonic Hall Trust Board Act 
 Whangarei City Constitution Act 
 Wheat Board Act  Amended: 1969/70/76/77/80/81/86
 Winston Churchill Memorial Trust Act  Amended: 1985/88
Plus 107 Acts amended

1966  

 Airport Authorities Act  Amended: 1968/82/86/88/93/96/97/2000
 Alcoholism and Drug Addiction Act  Amended: 1970/75/87
 Consumer Council Act  Amended: 1969/80/82/85
 Hawke's Bay Catchment Board Rating Act 
 Industrial Design Act  Amended: 1974/79/82/87
 Inventions Development Act 
 Levin Borough Empowering Act  Amended: 1968
 Mangawai Lands Empowering Act 
 Medical and Dental Auxiliaries Act  Amended: 1968/69/72/74/78/81/88
 New Plymouth City Electricity and Gas Empowering Act 
 Niue Act  Amended: 1968/70/71/73/74/2007
 Northland Harbour Board Vesting and Empowering Act 
 Palmerston North Reserves Empowering Act  Amended: 1988/93/2003
 Republic of Malawi Act 
 Republic of Singapore Act 
 Republic of Tanzania Act 
 Royal Antediluvian Order of Buffaloes Trust Act 
 South Auckland Local Authorities Empowering Act 
 Submarine Cables and Pipelines Protection Act  Amended: 1977
 Tokoroa Town Empowering Act  Amended: 1970
Plus 93 Acts amended

1967  

 Agricultural Pests Destruction Act  Amended: 1968/71/72/74/75/77/79/80/82/86/88
 Animal Remedies Act  Amended: 1968/69/71/72/76/81/82/94
 Animals Act  Amended: 1969/74/76/77/80/81/82/83/90/91
 Auckland Harbour Board and Waitemata County Council Empowering Act 
 Berryfruit Levy Act  Amended: 1970/74/83/88
 Costs in Criminal Cases Act  Amended: 1968
 Door to Door Sales Act  Amended: 1973
 Electoral Poll Act 
 Electricity Distribution Commission Act  Amended: 1968/69
 Hauraki Gulf Maritime Park Act 
 Insolvency Act  Amended: 1972/76/78/81/85/86/87/90/93/94/98/99/2001/04
 Lesotho Act 
 Natural Gas Corporation Act  Amended: 1973/76
 Republic of Botswana Act 
 Rotorua City Geothermal Energy Empowering Act 
 Sale of Liquor Poll Act 
 Tarawera Forest Act 
 Technicians Training Act  Amended: 1985
 The Nurse Maude District Nursing Association Act 
 Water and Soil Conservation Act  Amended: 1968/69/71/72/73/74/76/77/80/81/83/87/88/90
Plus 138 Acts amended

1968  

 Broadcasting Authority Act  Amended: 1971
 Bryant Nursery Trust Board Enabling Act 
 Christchurch Town Hall Empowering Act 
 Customs Orders Confirmation Act 
 Diplomatic Privileges and Immunities Act  Amended: 1971/85/94/96/97/98/2004
 Guardianship Act  Amended: 1969/70/71/73/77/79/80/82/83/85/88/91/94/95/96/98
 Litter Act  Amended: 1970/85/90/2006
 Maori and Island Affairs Department Act 
 Marine Farming Act  Amended: 1975/76/77/83/87/90/92/93
 Maternal Mortality Research Act  Amended: 1979
 Ministry of Transport Act  Amended: 1971/72/73/75/79/83/88
 New Zealand Ports Authority Act  Amended: 1969/70/78
 Protection of Depositors Act  Amended: 1972
 Quantity Surveyors Act  Amended: 1969/79/83/87/88
 Slack Adoption Act 
 Swaziland Act 
 Tawa Borough Empowering Act 
 Tokoroa Agricultural and Pastoral Association Empowering Act 
 Trespass Act  Amended: 1981/87
 Vocational Training Council Act  Amended: 1972/75/76/79/81/85/88
 Warkworth Anglican Burial Ground Act 
Plus 125 Acts amended

1969  
Administration Act 1969
 Building Research Levy Act  Amended: 1975/82
 Clarke Adoption Act 
 Consumer Information Act 
 Food and Drug Act  Amended: 1977
 Foote Adoption Act 
 General Wage Orders Act 
 Hotel Association of New Zealand Act  Amended: 1994
 Manawatu Patriotic Society Act 
 Mental Health Act  Amended: 1954/57/58/59/61/72/75/76/77/79/82/85
 Minors' Contracts Act 1969  Amended: 1970/71/74/85/2005
 New Zealand Security Intelligence Service Act  Amended: 1977/96/99/2003
 Public Bodies Leases Act  Amended: 1971/76/80
 Republic of Nauru Act 
 State Services Remuneration and Conditions of Employment Act  Amended: 1970/71/73/75
 Status of Children Act  Amended: 1971/78/79/83/87/90/94/2004/07
 Tauranga City Council Empowering Act  Repealed: 1979
 Wairarapa Cadet Training Farm Act  Amended: 1975
Plus 105 Acts amended

1970s

1970  
 Age of Majority Act 
 Australia and New Zealand Banking Group Act 
 Bay of Plenty Harbour Board Act 
 Gisborne Harbour Board Loan and Empowering Act  Amended: 1972
 Hutt County Special Rates Amalgamation Act 
 Illegal Contracts Act  Amended: 1985/2002
 Industrial Research and Development Grants Act 
 Kapuni Petroleum Act  Amended: 1976
 Marlborough Forestry Corporation Act  Amended: 1983
 Mataura Borough Council Empowering Act 
 National Heart Foundation of New Zealand Empowering Act 
 Payroll Tax Act  Repealed: 1973
 Plants Act 
 Queen Elizabeth the Second Technicians' Study Award Act  Amended: 1987/88/91
 Republic of Guyana Act 
 Republic of The Gambia Act 
 Te Aroha Borough Endowment Empowering Act 
 Tonga Act 
Plus 139 Acts amended

1971  
 Aircrew Industrial Tribunal Act  Amended: 1977/78/79/82/84/85
 Armed Forces Discipline Act  Amended: 1976/80/81/85/88/97/98/99/2001/03/05/07
 Auckland Improvement Trust Act  Amended: 1973/86/2001
 Bank of New Zealand Officers' Provident Association Act  Amended: 1957
 Consular Privileges and Immunities Act 
 Department of Social Welfare Act  Amended: 1981/88
 Franklin-Manukau Pests Destruction Act 
 Gaming Duties Act  Amended: 1976/86/91/92/95/96
 Hawke's Bay Hospital Board Empowering Act  Amended: 1986
 Hire Purchase Act  Amended: 1972/74/85/99
 Hovercraft Act 
 Invercargill City Aluminium Smelter Water Supply Act 
 Lake Waikaremoana Act 
 Layby Sales Act  Amended: 2000
 Marine Reserves Act  Amended: 1975/77/80
 Northland Harbour Board Vesting Act 
 Nurses Act  Amended: 1975/80/83/85/90/94/99
 Primary Products Marketing Regulations Validation and Confirmation Act 
 Queenstown Reserves Vesting and Empowering Act 
 Race Relations Act  Amended: 1980/89
 Racing Act  Amended: 1974/77/79/80/83/86/88/89/92/95/2000/05/06/07
 Republic of Sierra Leone Act 
 Seamen's Union Funds Act 
 Stabilisation of Remuneration Act  Amended: 1971
 Stamp and Cheque Duties Act  Amended: 1972/74/75/76/77/78/80/81/82/83/88/89/91/92/93/94/95/96
 Unclaimed Money Act  Amended: 1988/90
Plus 122 Acts amended

1972  
 Accident Compensation Act  Amended: 1972/73/74/75/77/78/79/80/81/83/84/85/87/88/89/90/91/92
 Auckland Agricultural Pastoral and Industrial Shows Board Act 
 Auckland Regional Authority Empowering Act 
 Aviation Crimes Act  Amended: 1973/99/2007
 Children's Health Camps Act  Amended: 1979/83/85/88/91
 Clean Air Act  Amended: 1982/86/87/88
 Equal Pay Act  Amended: 1973/76/90/91
 Minister of Local Government Act 
 Ministry of Energy Resources Act  Amended: 1973
 National Art Gallery, Museum, and War Memorial Act  Amended: 1978
 National Housing Commission Act  Amended: 1977/86
 New Zealand Anglican Church Pension Fund Act 
 Pacific Islands Polynesian Education Foundation Act  Amended: 1975/81/87
 R O Bradley Estate Act  Amended: 1994
 Republic of Bangladesh Act 
 Republic of Sri Lanka Act 
 St John's College Trusts Act 
 Testing Laboratory Registration Act  Amended: 1981/83/88/2006
 Unit Titles Act  Amended: 1973/79/80/81/93/2003
 University of Albany Act  Amended: 1973
 Wanganui Harbour Board Empowering Act 
 Wellington Regional Water Board Act  Amended: 1975/76/83
 Wool Marketing Corporation Act  Amended: 1974/75/76
Plus 124 Acts amended

See also 
The above list may not be current and will contain errors and omissions. For more accurate information try:
 Walter Monro Wilson, The Practical Statutes of New Zealand, Auckland: Wayte and Batger 1867
 The Knowledge Basket: Legislation NZ
 New Zealand Legislation Includes some Imperial and Provincial Acts. Only includes Acts currently in force, and as amended.
 Legislation Direct List of statutes from 2003 to order

Lists of statutes of New Zealand